|}

The T. A. Morris Memorial Mares Chase is a Listed National Hunt steeplechase in Ireland which is open to mares aged four years or older. It is run at Clonmel over a distance about 2 miles and 4 furlongs (2 miles 4 furlongs and 51 yards, or 4,070 metres). The race is for novice chasers, and it is scheduled to take place each year in November.

The race was first run in 2004 when it had Listed status.  It was awarded Grade 3 status in 2009 and downgraded back to Listed status in 2017.

Records
Most successful horse  (2 wins):
 Blazing Tempo – 2010, 2011
 Shattered Love – 2019, 2020

Leading jockey  (5 wins):
 Ruby Walsh – Moskova  (2009), Blazing Tempo (2010), Tarla (2012), Vroum Vroum Mag (2015), Westerner Lady (2016)

Leading trainer  (7 wins):
 Willie Mullins – Blazing Tempo (2010, 2011), Tarla (2012), Vroum Vroum Mag (2015), Westerner Lady (2016), Camelia de Cotte (2018), Dolcita (2022)

Winners

See also 
 Horse racing in Ireland
 List of Irish National Hunt races

References
Racing Post:

National Hunt chases
National Hunt races in Ireland
Clonmel Racecourse
Recurring sporting events established in 2004
2004 establishments in Ireland